Diana Hatler (born 1 August 1963) is a Puerto Rican former swimmer. She competed in four events at the 1976 Summer Olympics.

References

External links
 

1963 births
Living people
Puerto Rican female swimmers
Olympic swimmers of Puerto Rico
Swimmers at the 1976 Summer Olympics
Place of birth missing (living people)